The 5 cm Pak 38 (L/60) (5 cm Panzerabwehrkanone 38 (L/60)) was a German anti-tank gun of 50 mm calibre. It was developed in 1938 by Rheinmetall-Borsig AG as a successor to the 3.7 cm Pak 36, and was in turn followed by the 7.5 cm Pak 40. Note the unique curved gun-shield design which differs from most WWII anti-tank guns which have either one flat or two angled and one flat gun-shield plates for ease of manufacturing.

Successor to the Pak 36

After the Spanish Civil War, the German authorities started to think that a new anti-tank gun would be needed, even though the 3.7 cm Pak 36 had proven to be very successful. They asked Rheinmetall-Borsig to produce a new and more capable AT-gun. They first designed the Pak 37 in 1935, but the German authorities did not approve it because of its low capabilities. Rheinmetall-Borsig were forced to create a new gun under the designation Pak 38, which fitted a new and longer L/60 barrel and was approved for mass production in 1939.

Variants
The original tank gun for the Panzer III was the 5 cm KwK 38, which despite being the same 5 cm caliber and showing the same model year (1938) should not be confused with this gun, as it was lower velocity with a shorter barrel length (L/42 calibers) and smaller cartridge. When a more powerful gun with greater penetration was needed for the Panzer III the longer barrel 5 cm KwK 39 gun (L/60 calibers) was developed as a variant of the 5 cm Pak 38 towed anti-tank gun.

Service

The Pak 38 was first used by the German forces during the Second World War in April 1941. When the Germans faced Soviet tanks in 1941 during Operation Barbarossa, the Pak 38 was one of the few early guns capable of penetrating the  sloped armor of the T-34's hull at close range. The gun was also equipped with Panzergranate 40 APCR shots with a hard tungsten carbide core, in an attempt to penetrate the armor of the heavier KV-1 tank.

Although it was replaced by more powerful weapons, it remained a useful weapon and remained in service with the Wehrmacht until the end of the war.

The Pak 38 carriage was also used for the 7.5 cm Pak 97/38 and the 7.5 cm Pak 50 guns.

Romania imported 110 Pak 38s in March 1943. The guns remained in service with the Romanian Armed Forces until 1954, when the 57 mm anti-tank gun M1943 (ZiS-2) replaced them.

Performance

References

External links
Intelligence report on Pak 38 at Lonesentry.com
Armor penetration table at Panzerworld

World War II anti-tank guns of Germany
50 mm artillery
Weapons and ammunition introduced in 1940